Spooky Action is the debut solo album by English singer songwriter and ex-Mansun frontman Paul Draper, released on 11 August 2017. It entered the UK Albums Chart at No. 19 and peaked at No. 3 on the UK Independent Albums Chart.

Background
The album was conceived over a period of over ten years. Whilst Draper had been working with Skunk Anansie's Skin on her second album, he had recorded some demos. Many of those recordings were later archived by Draper and had been forgotten about. Draper returned to the recordings, having co-produced The Anchoress's debut solo album to press attention and critical acclaim and re-worked those recordings in addition to new material.

“I had a lot to write about. It was just another form of therapy. It's been a cathartic process. I don't work in a professional manner, I do it to heal something – whatever that is. I got a lot of anger out and I'm on the other side of it now. It's taken a lot to get there."

Critical reception
The album holds a rating of 79 out of 100 on Metacritic, indicating positive reviews. Uncut described the album as possessing "impressive heft", whilst Mojo's positive review highlighted "strong synth tunes and beats, bristling with vocal angst". In its five-star review, Louder Sound commented that the album "benefits from a strength of songwriting most often found on artists' debut albums, when they've had a lifetime of tunes to draw on, rather than a few weeks holed up in a studio with a record company breathing down their necks."

Accolades
Spooky Action was nominated for Album of the Year at the annual Progressive Music Awards.

Commercial performance
The album entered and peaked at No. 19 on the UK Albums Chart. On the independent albums chart, it peaked at No. 3.

Track listing
All songs written by Paul Draper, unless otherwise stated.

 "Don't Poke the Bear" (Paul Draper, Catherine Anne Davies)
 "Grey House"
 "Things People Want" (Paul Draper, Richard Ayre)
 "Who's Wearing the Trousers"
 "Jealousy Is a Powerful Emotion" (Paul Draper, Catherine Anne Davies)
 "Friends Make the Worst Enemies" (Paul Draper, Catherine Anne Davies)
 "Feeling My Heart Run Slow"
 "You Don't Really Know Someone 'til You Fall Out with Them" (Paul Draper, Catherine Anne Davies)
 "Can't Get Fairer Than That"
 "Feel Like I Wanna Stay" (Paul Draper, Dominic Chad)
 "The Inner Wheel (Paul Draper, Catherine Anne Davies)

Personnel 

 Paul Draper - guitars, keyboards, piano, synths, vocals
 Ben Stack - bass
 Jon Barnett - drums
 Catherine Anne Davies - synthesizer on tracks 3, 4 & 11, piano on track 6, Vox Continental on tracks 6 & 8, backing vocals on tracks 6, 10 & 11
 Andy Lyth - bongos on track 1
 Gill Wood - strings on track 1, cello on tracks 6 & 8
 Matt Davey - additional guitar on track 5

Production 

 Produced by Paul Draper
 Mixed by Paul "PDub" Walton at The Loft
 Engineered by Paul "PDub" Walton and Scott Knapper
 Additional Engineering by Catherine Anne Davies
 Assistant Engineer: Ben Sink
 Mastered by Jon Astley

Design 

 Design & Art Direction by Steve Stacey
 Portrait Photography by Anthony Gerace

B-sides
From EP One
 "No Ideas"
 "The Silence Is Deafening"

From EP Two
 "Some Things Are Better Left Unsaid"
 "Don't You Wait, It Might Never Come"
 "Friends Make the Worst Enemies" (acoustic)

Remixes
From EP One
 "F.M.H.R.S." (The Sad Twilight Remix)

Formats
The album was released on the following physical formats: 
 
 Standard digipack CD
 Double black vinyl (orders from the official store included a signed art print)
 'Indies Only' double black vinyl with free 7" single containing 'No Ideas' and 'Friends Make The Worst Enemies' ('Public Service Broadcasting Remix)
 Limited edition hand numbered cassette
 Limited edition double white vinyl
 Limited edition double clear vinyl
 Special edition double CD (with Live at Scala)
 Limited edition 3-disc book set (with outtakes and documentary)

Tour and Live at Scala
Draper went on a UK tour with a full band to support the album. The 21 September 2017 concert at The Scala in London was recorded and released as a live album on 16 February 2018. The live album was released on vinyl and CD as well as a special edition double-CD package with Spooky Action.

Spooky Action 2017 Tour dates:

Thu 14th Leeds, Brudenell Social Club

Fri 15th Manchester, Gorilla

Sat 16th Glasgow, King Tuts

Thu 21st London, Scala

Fri 22nd Bristol, Thekla

Sat 23rd Birmingham, Institute 2

Charts

References 

2017 debut albums
Kscope albums